Kripa Ram khiriya was a famous Rajasthani poet from what is today India.

He wrote the 'Rajia Ra Doha' on Ethics (नीति) in Rajasthani during the reign of Rao Raja Devi Singh. It contained 140 couplets, but now only 127 are available.

References

External links
 Kavi kriparamji and Rajiya ke dohe
 sikar.nic.in

Indian male poets
Rajasthani-language writers
People from Sikar district
Year of birth missing
Year of death missing
19th-century Indian poets
Poets from Rajasthan
19th-century Indian male writers

Charan
Dingal poets